Dharmapur may refer to:

Dharmapur, West Bengal, India
Dharmapur, Nepal
Dharmapur, Satkania Upazila, Chittagong, Bangladesh
Dharmapur (Vidhan Sabha constituency), Assam Legislative Assembly, India
Dharmpur (disambiguation)

Dharampur 
Dharampur, Gujarat Assembly constituency
Dharampur, Himachal Pradesh Assembly constituency